The  J. R. Carmichael House, also known as the Carmichael House, is a historic residence in Jackson, Georgia. It was added to the National Register of Historic Places in 1977. It is located at 149 McDonough Road.

It was designed by Atlanta architects Bruce & Morgan.  Its NRHP nomination describes it as "a marvelous assemblage of forms perhaps best described as the Queen Anne style."  It has an asymmetric front facade, and has turrets, dormers, and decorated chimneys.

See also
National Register of Historic Places listings in Butts County, Georgia

References

Houses on the National Register of Historic Places in Georgia (U.S. state)
Houses in Georgia (U.S. state)
Queen Anne architecture in Georgia (U.S. state)
Houses completed in 1897